Theoretical Computer Science (TCS) is a computer science journal published by Elsevier, started in 1975 and covering theoretical computer science. The journal publishes 52 issues a year. It is abstracted and indexed by Scopus and the Science Citation Index. According to the Journal Citation Reports, its 2020 impact factor is 0.827.

References

Computer science journals
Elsevier academic journals
Publications established in 1975